The Chad national football team, nicknamed Les Sao,  represents Chad in international football and is controlled by the Chadian Football Federation, the governing body for football in the country. The team has never qualified for the World Cup finals or Africa Cup of Nations. Home matches are played at the Idriss Mahamat Ouya Stadium. In April 2021, FIFA banned the Chad national football team from participating in global football over the Chadian government's interference with the Chadian Football Federation.

History
The Chadian Football Federation was founded in 1962 and became affiliated to FIFA and CAF in 1988.

Chad's national football team did not play a big role in world football until the 1990s. They did not enter any qualifiers for Continental or World Cups until the early 1990s when they played their first qualifying matches for the 1992 Africa Cup of Nations, hosted by Senegal. Until then, they played mostly friendly matches and minor cups, mostly with African teams.

The national team had a difficult start − the first match they ever played was in the L'Amitié Tournament, which took place in Senegal in 1963, and it was a 2–1 defeat to Liberia. Soon after, they suffered a 6–2 loss to Dahomey (now Benin).

The Chad national football team never qualified for either the Africa Cup of Nations or the World Cup. Their first participation in the World Cup qualifiers was in 2000 when they were eliminated in the first round by Liberia, losing 0–1 at home, and playing 0–0 away. They were coached by Marcel Mao. Their next attempt was in 2003, under Yann Djim, but they were eliminated by Angola. They won their first home game when Francis Oumar Belonga scored a hat trick, 3–1. They lost their away match 2–0, and went no further. The qualifiers for the 2010 World Cup brought more matches because they played in a group phase together with Mali, Sudan and Congo. They finished at the bottom of the group, with six points (two wins and four losses).

In the qualifying competition for the 2014 World Cup, Chad faced Tanzania in a first-round playoff. Tanzania advanced despite shockingly losing 1–0 at home at Dar es Salaam's National Stadium. The Taifa Stars were tipped for an emphatic victory over the visitors, having won the first-leg 2–1 in N'Djamena. Chad stunned the home side three minutes after the break when Mahamat Ahmat Labo struck to silence the home crowd. But Tanzania managed to progress to the next round thanks to the away goals rule as they were tied 2–2 on aggregate.

Chad played against Malawi in the qualifiers for the 2013 Africa Cup of Nations. Chad won the first leg match 3–2, but lost 2–0 in Blantyre to be eliminated with an aggregate score of 4–3.

In the qualifiers for the 2015 Africa Cup of Nations, Malawi was the opponent once again. Chad lost 2–0 in the first leg at Kamuzu Stadium in Blantyre, but they won 3–1 in at Idriss Mahamat Ouya Stadium in N'Djamena, losing on the away goals rule. Forward Robin Ngalande turned into a savior for Malawi when he came off the bench to score a crucial late goal.

The biggest achievement for Chad so far is a CEMAC Cup (Economic and Monetary Community of Central Africa) title in 2014, after beating Congo 3–2 in the final on December 14 in Bata, Equatorial Guinea. French-born Emmanuel Trégoat managed the team. Their previous best was a second place in the 2005 edition, when they lost to Cameroon in the final.

Les Sao had a disappointing start into their qualifying campaign for the 2017 Africa Cup of Nations, losing 2–0 to Nigeria and slumping to a 5–1 defeat at home against Egypt. But it was then that things took a turn for the better, as coach Moudou Kouta, who was in charge of the side on an interim basis, took the team to an unexpected victory against Sierra Leone in the first round of the qualifiers for the 2018 World Cup. Les Sao won 1–0 at home and even though they were beaten 2–1 in the return leg, they advanced to the second round of the qualifiers on away goals. Chad sensationally defeated Egypt 1–0 at home in the second round before falling to a 4–0 defeat in Alexandria three days later.

In March 2016, the Chadian Football Federation announced they were withdrawing from the 2017 Africa Cup of Nations qualification due to financial problems. The team was subsequently banned from entering the following edition, meaning they would play no official games for over three years until September 2019, when Chad lost 1–3 at home to Sudan in  
2022 FIFA World Cup qualification. A month later Les Sao defeated Liberia on penalties to reach the Group Stage of 2021 Africa Cup of Nations qualification.

In March 2021, the Chadian government dissolved the Chadian Football Federation, leaving Chad facing a likely ban under FIFA regulations that prevent governments from interfering in the running of a country's football team. In April 2021, FIFA announced an indefinite ban from global football, citing the Chadian government's interference. Due to this decision, CAF disqualified Chad from its participation in the 2021 AFCON qualifiers.

Kits

During the independence of Chad, the team competed in international matches and played in a blue shirt, blue shorts, and red socks. These are the national colours of the French flag. In the 1970s, Chad's home colors changed to blue-yellow-red. Their first away kit in 1960 was white shirt, red shorts, and white socks. In 1980, the away kit color changed into red shirt, blue shorts, and yellow socks.

Recent results

2022

Coaching history

 Vasily Sokolov (1967–1971)
 Anzor Kavazashvili (1976–1977)
 Moussarou Ngongolo (1998) 
 Yann Djim Ngarlendana (1998) 
 Douba Djibrine (1999)
 Marcel Mao (2000)
 Jean Paul Akono (2002–2003)
 Yann Djim Ngarlendana (2003)
 Yann Djim Ngarlendana (2005–2006)
 Moudou Kouta (2006)
 Natoltiga Okalah (2006–2007)
 Mahamat Adoum (2007)
 Natoltiga Okalah (2008)
 Sherif El-Khashab (2009–2011)
 Moudou Kouta (2011–2013)
 Emmanuel Trégoat (2014–2015) 
 Rigobert Song (2015)
 Moudou Kouta (2015–2016)
 Djimtan Yatamadji (2019)
 Emmanuel Trégoat (2019–2020)
 Djimtan Yatamadji (2020–present)

Players

Current squad
The following players have been called up for the 2023 AFCON preliminary round  matches against Gambia in March 2022.

Caps and goals current as of 27 March 2022 after the match against Gambia.

Recent call-ups
The following players have been called up for Chad in the last 12 months.

DEC Player refused to join the team after the call-up.
INJ Player withdrew from the squad due to an injury.
PRE Preliminary squad.
RET Player has retired from international football.
SUS Suspended from the national team.

Player records

Players in bold are still active with Chad.

Most capped players

Top goalscorers

Competitive record

FIFA World Cup

Africa Cup of Nations

Head-to-head records against other countries

Achievements
CEMAC Cup :
Winner: 2014
1 Time Runners-up
UDEAC Championship :
2 Time Runners-up

See also

List of Chad international footballers
Football in Chad

References

External links
 Chadian Football Federation 
 
 National football team of Chad picture

 
African national association football teams